Sook Khurd is a village situated near Sook Kalan in the district of Gujrat, Pakistan. It is about 6 kilometers in the north of Gujrat.

References

Villages in Gujrat District